Dalashan (also Romanized as Dālāshān; also known as Dāl Āshīān ) means griffon vulture's nest is a village in Rivand Rural District, in the Central District of Nishapur County, Razavi Khorasan Province, Iran. At the 2006 census, its population was 0.

References 

Populated places in Nishapur County